Kent is a county in the south-eastern corner of England. It is bounded to the north by Greater London and the Thames Estuary, to the west by Sussex and Surrey, and to the south and east by the English channel and the North Sea. The county town is Maidstone. It is governed by Kent County Council, with twelve district councils, Ashford, Canterbury, Dartford, Dover, Folkestone and Hythe, Gravesham, Maidstone, Thanet, Tonbridge and Malling and Tunbridge Wells. Medway is a separate unitary authority. The chalk hills of the North Downs run from east to west through the county, with the wooded Weald to the south. The coastline is alternately flat and cliff-lined.

Local nature reserves are designated by local authorities under the National Parks and Access to the Countryside Act 1949. The local authority must have legal control over the site, by owning or leasing it or having an agreement with the owner. Local nature reserves are sites which have a special local interest either biologically or geologically. Local authorities have a duty to care for them and can apply local bye-laws to manage and protect them.

As of May 2018, there are 42 local nature reserves in the county. Thirteen are Sites of Special Scientific Interest, five are Ramsar internationally important wetland sites, three are Nature Conservation Review sites, five are Special Protection Areas under the European Union Directive on the Conservation of Wild Birds, two are Special Areas of Conservation, one is a Geological Conservation Review site, one includes a scheduled monument, one is a national nature reserve, five are managed by the Kent Wildlife Trust and one is owned by Plantlife.

Key

Other classifications
KWT = Kent Wildlife Trust
GCR = Geological Conservation Review
NCR = Nature Conservation Review site
NNR = National nature reserve
Plant = Plantlife, a wild plant conservation charity
Ramsar = Ramsar site, an internationally important wetland site
SAC = Special Area of Conservation
SM = Scheduled monument
SPA = Special Protection Area under the European Union Directive on the Conservation of Wild Birds
 SSSI = Site of Special Scientific Interest

Sites

See also
List of Sites of Special Scientific Interest in Kent
Kent Wildlife Trust

Notes

References

Sources

 
Kent
Kent-related lists